The 2020 South Australian National Football League season (officially the SANFL Statewide Super League) was the 141st season of the South Australian National Football League (SANFL), the highest-level Australian rules football competition in South Australia.
The season was originally scheduled to run from April 2020 until September 2020; however its commencement was delayed to June 2020 due to the COVID-19 pandemic.

Impact of COVID-19 pandemic
The 2020 season was disrupted by the COVID-19 pandemic, which was formally declared a pandemic on 11 March 2020, three weeks prior to the scheduled start of the premiership season. Governmental restrictions on non-essential public gatherings greater than 500 people meant that, as a minimum, matches would need to be played before empty stadiums, as was planned for the Australian Football League; however, it was announced on 16 March that SANFL season was suspended indefinitely. A shortened season may still be played commencing no earlier than 31 May, depending on the status of the pandemic; no decision has yet been made on whether the season will be cancelled entirely, but this remains a possibility in the event of a prolonged pandemic. South Australia's two AFL clubs, Adelaide and Port Adelaide, did not field teams as the AFL issued an order banning its clubs from fielding AFL-listed players in state leagues.
On 14 June 2020, the first two rounds of the revised fixture were announced, with all games in those rounds to be played at Adelaide Oval.

Premiership Season

Round 1

Round 2

Round 3

Round 4

Round 5

Round 6

Round 7

Round 8

Round 9

Round 10

Round 11

Round 12

Round 13

Round 14

Ladder

Finals series

Semi-finals

Preliminary final

Grand Final

References 

South Australian National Football League seasons
SANFL